Molly Anne Rainford (born 22 November 2000) is an English singer, actress and television presenter. She was a finalist on the sixth series of Britain's Got Talent in 2012 and was one of the presenters on Friday Download between 2014 and 2015. She has since released two extended plays and has gone on to portray the titular character in the CBBC comedy drama series Nova Jones from 2021 onwards. In 2022, Rainford competed in the twentieth series of Strictly Come Dancing; she reached the final and finished as a runner-up. Then in 2023, she was cast in the BBC soap opera EastEnders.

Life and career

Early life and Britain's Got Talent
Rainford was born on 22 November 2000 in the London Borough of Havering. Her father is former Chelmsford City F.C. midfielder and assistant manager Dave Rainford. She attended the Sylvia Young Theatre School and later East London Arts & Music. In 2012, at the age of 11, she auditioned for the sixth series of Britain's Got Talent, singing her own version of Jennifer Hudson's "One Night Only" from the film Dreamgirls. She advanced to the semi-final stages where she sang "It Must Have Been Love" by Roxette; Rainford made it through to the final after finishing second in the public vote. In the final, she sang Beyoncé's version of "Ave Maria" and finished the competition in sixth place. Following the show, she was signed to Sony Music.

Television and music career
In 2014, Rainford joined the presenting team on the CBBC children's entertainment series Friday Download alongside Akai Osei and Bars and Melody, appearing as a presenter on the eighth and ninth series until the show's cancellation in 2015. In 2016, she appeared in an episode of CBBC's Millie Inbetween as Chloe. In 2021, Rainford began starring in the CBBC comedy drama Nova Jones, portraying the titular character, with the series focusing on the life and adventures of a galactic pop singer. The series was subsequently renewed for a second and third series.

In 2019, she released her debut extended play Commitment, which featured the songs "I Like You", "Long Run", "Forever and a Day", "How Many Times" and the titular single "Commitment", which has amassed over two million streams online. In 2020, she released a second EP, Christmas (Baby Please Come Home), which featured covers of Christmas songs including "Happy Xmas (War Is Over)", "Who Would Imagine a King", "I Wish It Could Be Christmas Everyday" and the title track. In 2022, Rainford was announced as a contestant on the twentieth series of Strictly Come Dancing. Partnered with Carlos Gu, the pair reached the final where they performed finished as a runner-up. Shortly after Rainford completed her run in the Strictly Come Dancing national tour in 2023, it was announced that she had been cast on the BBC soap opera EastEnders. Her character is set to be a daughter in a family introduced as new owners of the fictional Queen Vic pub.

Filmography

Discography

Extended plays

Singles

References

2000 births
21st-century English actresses
21st-century English singers
Alumni of the Sylvia Young Theatre School
Britain's Got Talent contestants
British children's television presenters
English child actresses
English child singers
English soap opera actresses
English television actresses
English television presenters
Living people
Participants in British reality television series
People from the London Borough of Havering